The Springer Farm is a historic farm located at Hockessin, New Castle County, Delaware. The property includes four contributing buildings.  They are a stone house (c. 1798), a stone and frame bank barn (c. 1820), a stone spring house, and a braced frame corn crib, both dated to the 19th century.  The house is a two-story, gable-roofed, fieldstone structure on a coursed fieldstone foundation.

It was added to the National Register of Historic Places in 1986.

References

Farms on the National Register of Historic Places in Delaware
Houses completed in 1798
Houses in New Castle County, Delaware
National Register of Historic Places in New Castle County, Delaware